BrickHouse Security is a New York City-based security company that sells security systems, including video cameras and hidden cameras, and GPS trackers to law enforcement agencies, businesses and individuals.  The company is the parent company of GPS tracking device companies Securus and Zoombak.

The company has received media coverage for a variety of security related products ranging from devices protecting Airbnb owners from abusive renters, lost children locators, and trackers to protect stolen figurines from church nativity scenes.

As of 2015, the company reported that it provides security solutions to over 40,000 small businesses, over 2,500 law enforcement agencies and over 500,000 families. The company also has an office in Indianapolis, IN.

History

BrickHouse Security was founded by Todd Morris in 2005, in response to a market need he saw for a strong company selling home security and surveillance products, including computer security products, tracking devices and hidden cameras.  BrickHouse Security launched as an online reseller with just two items for sale.  The company was self-funded, and by February 2010, had grown to $12.5M in revenue with 35 employees.

In 2015 BrickHouse Security acquired GPS device manufacturer Securus, known for the eZoom, eCare and SpotLite GPS tracking devices for children, elders and pets, as well as GPS tracking provider Zoombak, itself acquired by Securus in February 2011.  The deal consolidated the three asset tracking businesses under one brand and one tracking platform.

Products

The company divides its products into four categories: alarm systems, GPS trackers, security cameras and hidden cameras.

Alarm systems

BrickHouse markets alarm systems under the 2GIG, TattleTale and Dakota Alert brands.  The company also sells MORzA Sentry home security equipment which includes remote monitoring capabilities using a control panel branded as MORzA Go!.

GPS trackers

BrickHouse Security's GPS tracking devices include personal and fleet tracking devices.

Security cameras

BrickHouse Security's security cameras include versions featuring night vision, dashboard mounting, IP cameras for remote viewing, mini cameras and professional CCTV systems for businesses.

Hidden cameras

BrickHouse Security sells hidden cameras under the Camscura brand. The company also markets a camera and sensor system designed specifically for home sharing sites such as Airbnb and HomeAway called MORzA Airbnb, to protect owners from renters misusing the properties.  The system detects motion and movement that could indicate unwanted activity.

Media coverage

Todd Morris

The company's founder, Todd Morris, is a nationally recognized security consultant for businesses, and is a contributor to the security coverage of various media outlets including ABC News, Fox News, CNN and NBC's The Today Show.

Airbnb protection

The company received coverage for its MORzA Airbnb security system, which is targeted for Airbnb hosts concerned about misuse of their property by renters.  The device uses motion sensors to detect unusual motion patterns for the guests, such as doors being opened too frequently or private closets being opened.

Saving Jesus

The company received extensive media coverage for its Saving Jesus campaign, a program it launched in 2005 to loan GPS trackers to churches over the Christmas holiday season in order to protect the Baby Jesus and other figurines in their Christmas displays from theft.  The system uses cloud tracking to send a text or email alert to the owner if the figuring is moved.

Duracell ad controversy

In 2008, as part of its "Trusted Everywhere" campaign series, battery producer Duracell announced a partnership with BrickHouse Security to run a television commercial promoting BrickHouse Security's RFID Child Locator with Long Distance Alert.  The device came preinstalled with Duracell batteries.  Several media outlets including MSNBC and Consumers Digest voiced concerns that the ad was unnecessarily playing on parents' fears. The campaign was very successful and the company sold 4 months of inventory in the 48 hours after the ad first aired.

References

External links

Security companies of the United States
Companies based in New York City
Consulting firms established in 2005
Technology companies established in 2005
Security consulting firms
2005 establishments in New York City